Lorato Florence Tito is a South African politician and a Member of the South African National Assembly. Tito is a member of the Economic Freedom Fighters.

Biography
Tito matriculated from Tetlanyo Secondary School in Kimberley, Northern Cape. She holds diplomas in marketing and public administration and management.

Prior to her election to parliament, she was an EFF councillor in the Sol Plaatje Local Municipality and the Frances Baard District Municipality.

Tito stood as an EFF parliamentary candidate in the 2019 national elections, and was subsequently elected to the National Assembly and sworn in on 22 May 2019.

Since becoming an MP, Tito has been a member of the Portfolio Committee on Home Affairs.

References

External links

Living people
Year of birth missing (living people)
Place of birth missing (living people)
People from the Northern Cape
People from Frances Baard District Municipality
Economic Freedom Fighters politicians
Members of the National Assembly of South Africa
Women members of the National Assembly of South Africa